Radňovice is a municipality and village in Žďár nad Sázavou District in the Vysočina Region of the Czech Republic. It has about 300 inhabitants.

Notable people
František Zajíček (1912–1987), bobsledder
Bohumil Kosour (1913–1997), soldier and skier
Jaroslav Zajíček (1920–2002), cross-country skier

References

Villages in Žďár nad Sázavou District